Julie Ann Piekarski (born January 2, 1963 in St. Louis, Missouri) is an American actress, best known for her role as Sue Ann Weaver on The Facts of Life.

Piekarski got her first big break in show business as a Mouseketeer on The New Mickey Mouse Club in 1977. After gaining popularity working for Disney, she was cast as Sue Ann Weaver as an original cast member of The Facts of Life from 1979–1981. When the network decided to retool the show, Piekarski and several other members of the original cast were let go. She appeared as her character occasionally over the next couple of seasons and in a reunion episode in 1986. She went on to appear in several television shows, mainly making guest appearances, most notably on Diff'rent Strokes, General Hospital, Quincy, M.E., and Three's Company.

After a brief stint as an entertainment reporter on KPLR-TV in St. Louis, Piekarski was married to dentist John Probst from 1986 to 2017. They resided near St. Louis with their three children.

Filmography

Awards and nominations

References

External links

1963 births
Living people
20th-century American actresses
American child actresses
American television actresses
Mouseketeers
Actresses from St. Louis
People from St. Louis